Daniel Roy Cregan is an Australian lawyer and Independent politician who has served as Speaker of the South Australian House of Assembly since 12 October 2021. He has represented Kavel in the House of Assembly since the 2018 South Australian state election.

Early life

Cregan grew up in South Australia and Western Australia, attending the University of Adelaide, where he was active in student politics, including as a director of the Adelaide University Union and as president of the Adelaide University Law Students' Society. He also rowed for the Adelaide University Boat Club First VIII.

Cregan received a Cambridge Commonwealth Trust bursary to study law at Peterhouse, Cambridge.

Career

After graduating, Cregan was appointed judge's associate to John Doyle AC QC (Chief Justice of South Australia) and left that role to serve as an Australian Youth Ambassador for Development in Jakarta.

While a student at the University of Adelaide Cregan worked as a summer associate at Allens Linklaters, later joining the firm as a graduate lawyer and becoming a senior associate in the firm's disputes and investigations team.

Cregan also held a number of board appointments with the Australian Property Institute and as a director of a family company.

Before his election Cregan worked as a lawyer in the Adelaide Hills.

Parliamentary service

Following the election of Steven Marshall's government in March 2018, Cregan was made Chair of the South Australian Public Works Committee with oversight of South Australian infrastructure projects. 

In October 2021, Cregan announced that he would recontest his seat as an independent at the forthcoming 2022 South Australian state election saying the State Government had failed to plan for the needs of his rapidly growing regional community.

Election as Speaker  
On 12 October 2022, South Australia's Constitution Act was amended to adopt the United Kingdom practice of requiring an independent Speaker. Following passage of the constitutional changes, Cregan was elected Speaker of the South Australian House of Assembly 23 votes to 21. 

After the 2022 South Australian state election, Cregan was nominated unopposed by the Government and Opposition to serve as independent Speaker in the 55th Parliament of South Australia.

References

Members of the South Australian House of Assembly
Date of birth missing (living people)
Living people
Liberal Party of Australia members of the Parliament of South Australia
Independent members of the Parliament of South Australia
University of Adelaide alumni
Alumni of the University of Cambridge
21st-century Australian politicians
1984 births